Dermot John Murnaghan (born 26 December 1957) is a British broadcaster. He was a presenter for Sky News, a news presenter at CNBC Europe, Independent Television News and BBC News. He has presented news programmes in a variety of time slots since joining Sky News in 2007, until the end of February 2023.

He also presented the BBC quiz show Eggheads between 2003 and 2014 before Jeremy Vine took over full-time. 

On 8 September 2022, Murnaghan broke the news of Queen Elizabeth II's death and presented the afternoon rolling news coverage as Sky News was the first British television news organization to report the monarch's passing.

Early life and education
Murnaghan was born in Barnstaple, Devon in south-west England. He and his family later moved to Northern Ireland, first to Armagh, then to Newry, County Down, and then to Holywood.

Murnaghan was educated at two schools in Northern Ireland: St Malachy's Primary School in Armagh and Sullivan Upper School (a grammar school) in Holywood, followed by the University of Sussex in England, graduating with a master's degree in History in 1980. He then completed a postgraduate course in Journalism at City University London.

Career
Murnaghan worked as a trainee reporter on local newspapers before joining Channel 4 as a researcher and later a reporter for The Business Programme.

Murnaghan presented the European Business Channel in Switzerland before returning to the UK in 1989 to present the business segments on Channel 4's new breakfast programme The Channel 4 Daily, after which he became the show's main presenter in 1991, after the departure of original anchor Carol Barnes, until the programme ended in September 1992.

Murnaghan then presented programmes on ITV such as the ITV Lunchtime News and News at Ten. Between 1993 and 1997 he fronted approximately 100 episodes of current affairs series The Big Story. In 1997, as an ITN news presenter, Murnaghan broke the news of the death of Diana, Princess of Wales to viewers on ITV. He later presented the ITV Evening News and the ITV Nightly News when ITV relaunched their news output in 1999. He also worked on ITV's general election coverage in 2001.

From September 2002 to December 2007 Murnaghan was a main presenter of BBC Breakfast, replacing Jeremy Bowen. He presented the show alongside Sophie Raworth, Natasha Kaplinsky, Kate Silverton, Sian Williams and Susanna Reid. He was also a regular stand-in on the BBC Six O'Clock News and BBC Ten O'Clock News and co-presented the BBC News at Six on Fridays from September 2003 to summer 2007 alongside Sian Williams. His presenting style was lampooned in the impersonation sketch show Dead Ringers by Jon Culshaw, his widely spaced legs on the presenting couch mocked with the phrase "I'm Dermot Murnaghan, watch my crotch follow you round the room."

Whilst at the BBC, he co-presented BBC Two's Treasure Hunt (2002–2003), a revival of an earlier format on Channel 4 alongside Suzi Perry. He co-presented BBC Breakfast from Monday to Thursday as well as regularly fronting national BBC news bulletins until December 2007.

In October 2007, it was announced that Murnaghan would be leaving the BBC for Sky News. Murnaghan became the second news presenter to depart the corporation in the same month – Natasha Kaplinsky also left to join Five News, produced by Sky. His last time presenting Breakfast was 20 December 2007.

Murnaghan presented the BBC Two daytime show Eggheads from 2003 until 2014, as well as its short-lived spin-off series Are You an Egghead? in 2008 and 2009. Following his move to Sky News he shared this role with Jeremy Vine, who subsequently became the sole presenter in series 16. Murnaghan has guest presented reports for different travel shows including ITV's Wish You Were Here...? and BBC One's rival programme Holiday. He has made cameos as a newsreader in the 2004 film Wimbledon, Absolute Power and Midnight Man.

From January 2011 until December 2016, Murnaghan presented his own show entitled Murnaghan on Sky News that aired on Sunday mornings from 10 am until 12 noon. Since September 2016, he has presented Sky News Tonight from Monday to Thursday. For the 2019 general election Murnaghan hosted Sky News' overnight coverage, entitled The Brexit Election.

On the night of 8 September 2022, Dermot Murnaghan announced the death of Queen Elizabeth II, presenting the afternoon rolling news coverage following an announcement from Buckingham Palace earlier in the day as Sky News was the first television news organisation to report her passing.

Controversies

Chuka Umunna interview
On 19 January 2015, Murnaghan was criticised for his supposedly hostile attitude towards Shadow Business Secretary Chuka Umunna during an interview where Murnaghan asked Umunna if he agreed with the statement sent by the Communities Secretary to the Muslim community earlier in the day. Umunna acknowledged that he had not read it, though Murnaghan nonetheless continued to press the Shadow Business Secretary, resulting in an abrupt end to the interview after Murnaghan cut-off Umunna mid-speech by saying "so you are not going to speak until you get the party line right?" Umuna stormed out of the interview at this point. Viewers complained about the "poor attitude" exhibited by Murnaghan during the interview.

President Toomas Hendrik Ilves interview
On 8 February 2015, Murnaghan introduced the Estonian president, Toomas Hendrik Ilves, as Toomas Hendrik and proceeded to call him "President Hendrik". President Ilves removed his microphone and left, saying "Tell him to shut up, he can't even get my name right."

Raheem Kassam interview
On 14 February 2016, Murnaghan confronted British political activist and UKIP member Raheem Kassam on why he was not wearing a poppy in the United States. Kassam explained he forgot to place it in his new suit jacket but had donated £300 to the Royal British Legion. Murnaghan continued to press him, stating that it was "disrespectful" and that his news colleagues would be "heavily criticised" if they chose not to wear a poppy even if they donated. Kassam retorted they are "rightly criticised" for choosing not to wear one, which was "not applicable" in his case as he had simply forgotten it. Murnaghan quickly changed topic after Kassam's retort, which Kassam highlighted.

Personal life
In August 1989, Murnaghan married Maria Keegan in Camden; they have four children. They live together in North London. Murnaghan is an Arsenal fan.

In 2006, Murnaghan became president of the Television and Radio Industries Club (TRIC) and presented the TRIC Awards 2007.

On 9 March 2017, Murnaghan was involved in a hit and run accident. He was cycling through Kentish Town, northwest London, to his work at Sky News when the accident took place. Speaking to Sky News, Murnaghan said the driver of the car which hit him had been using a mobile phone when the incident occurred. The accident forced Murnaghan to be off air from his Sky News show and resulted in his having large bruise marks on the left-hand side of his face. Murnaghan thanked a "good Samaritan" who saw what had happened and told him that the car had sped off.

References

External links
 Dermot Murnaghan – Official Agent's website

1957 births
Living people
Mass media people from Barnstaple
People educated at Sullivan Upper School
Alumni of City, University of London
Alumni of the University of Sussex
British reporters and correspondents
ITN newsreaders and journalists
BBC newsreaders and journalists
Sky News newsreaders and journalists
People from Camden Town
British game show hosts
English people of Irish descent